Princess Ki (紀皇女) was a Japanese princess during the Asuka period of Japanese history. She was a daughter of Emperor Tenmu and Lady Ōnu, whose father was Soga no Akaye. Her brother was Prince Hozumi and her sister Princess Takata.

Genealogy
Some people say that she was once a wife of Prince Karu, a grandson of Empress Jitō, but no clear evidence exists.

The Man'yōshū includes some poems of her love of Prince Yuge, a son of Princess Ōe. No other historical materials recording about her life are existing. No records say that she married him.

Year of birth missing
Year of death missing
People of Asuka-period Japan
Japanese princesses
7th-century Japanese women
Man'yō poets
Daughters of emperors